Aber railway station is a railway station serving the town of Caerphilly, south Wales.

The station is located in the Bondfield Park and Trecenydd areas of Caerphilly.

History
Opened in April 1908 by the Rhymney Railway as Beddau Halt, it became part of the Great Western Railway during the Grouping of 1923, and renamed Aber Junction Halt on 17 September 1926. The line then passed] on nationalisation in 1948. It was renamed Aber Halt on 6 May 1968, then Aber on 5 May 1969.

When Sectorisation was introduced, the station was served by Regional Railways until the Privatisation of British Railways.

Another station also called Beddau Halt existed on the Llantrisant and Taff Vale Junction Railway and should not be confused with this station.

The former opened in 1858 and provided the Rhymney company with its original access to Cardiff General and the docks. This avoided the need for such trains to use the busy section through , even though the 3½ mile line was steeply graded (hence the nickname – the 1 in 48 ruling gradient was however favourable for loaded trains). The latter opened in 1894 and was used for both freight (to Windsor Colliery near the terminus) and passenger services.

The Senghenydd branch passenger service ended in June 1964 as a result of the Beeching Axe, but it remained in use for colliery traffic until 1977 whilst the Taffs Well route closed in June 1982 – both have since been dismantled.

Services

Spring 2016 
During Spring 2016 Aber railway station is served by 4 trains per hour each way, off peak, Monday to Friday:

 3 per hour from Bargoed to Penarth
 1 per hour from Rhymney to Penarth
 3 per hour from Penarth to Bargoed
 1 per hour from Penarth to Rhymney

Apart from Gilfach Fargoed, the station before Bargoed, which is served just once an hour, there is a train every 15 minutes calling at all stations between Bargoed and Penarth. In the evenings, the service drops to hourly and on Sundays to two-hourly (with southbound trains running to ).

References

Further reading 

  
 Station on navigable O.S. map

Railway stations in Caerphilly County Borough
DfT Category F2 stations
Transport in Caerphilly
Former Rhymney Railway stations
Railway stations in Great Britain opened in 1908
Railway stations served by Transport for Wales Rail
1908 establishments in Wales